Seasoning is the process of imparting flavor to, or improving the flavor of, food.

Seasoning may also refer to:

 Seasoning (cookware), adding a protective coating for iron or steel cookware
 Seasoning (slavery), the period of adjustment that slave traders and slaveholders subjected African slaves to following their arrival in the Americas.
 Wood drying, also known as seasoning, which is the reduction of the moisture content of wood prior to its use